Conus zonatus, common name the zoned cone, is a species of sea snail, a marine gastropod mollusk in the family Conidae, the cone snails and their allies.

Like all species within the genus Conus, these snails are predatory and venomous. They are capable of "stinging" humans, therefore live ones should be handled carefully or not at all.

Description
The size of the shell varies between 35 mm and 88 mm. The ground color of the shell is purple ash, with narrow chestnut revolving lines and white spots, the latter frequently irregularly coalescing.

Distribution
This marine species occurs off the Seychelles, in the Mascarene Bassin, and off India, Thailand and Sumatra.

References

 Bruguière, J. G., and Hwass, C. H., 1792. Cone. Encyclopédie Méthodique: Histoire Naturelle des Vers, 1: 586–757
 Tucker J.K. & Tenorio M.J. (2013) Illustrated catalog of the living cone shells. 517 pp. Wellington, Florida: MdM Publishing.

External links
 The Conus Biodiversity website
 Cone Shells – Knights of the Sea
 

zonatus
Gastropods described in 1792